Žulja is a village in the City of Mostar, Bosnia and Herzegovina.

Demographics 
According to the 2013 census, its population was 22, all Bosniaks.

References

Populated places in Mostar
Villages in the Federation of Bosnia and Herzegovina